The Royal Canadian Hussars (Montreal) (abbreviated as RCH) is an armoured reconnaissance regiment of the Primary Reserve in the Canadian Armed Forces. It is one of the oldest cavalry regiments in North America, tracing a direct history to the Montreal Volunteer Cavalry formed in the late eighteenth century. Its Colonel-in-Chief is Her Royal Highness, the Princess Royal, and its allied regiment is the Queen's Royal Hussars. Its mission consists of supporting the Regular Force in operational deployments, peacetime tasks, and supporting the civilian authorities.

Lineage

The Royal Canadian Hussars (Montreal) derives from the Montreal Volunteer Cavalry (formed in the late eighteenth century). The present regiment perpetuates five cavalry units and one armoured unit: the Royal Montreal Cavalry, the 5th Dragoons, the 6th Duke of Connaught's Royal Canadian Hussars (6th DCRCH), the 11th Argenteuil Rangers, the 17th Duke of York's Royal Canadian Hussars (17th DYRCH), and the 1st Motor Machine Gun Brigade.

The Royal Canadian Hussars (Montreal) 

 Originated on 14 November, 1879, in Montréal, Quebec, as the 6th Provisional Regiment of Cavalry.
 Redesignated on 18 September, 1885, as the 6th Regiment of Cavalry.
 Redesignated on 20 June, 1890, as the 6th Regiment of Cavalry “Duke of Connaught's Royal Canadian Hussars”.
 Redesignated on 1 January, 1893, as the 6th “Duke of Connaught's Royal Canadian Hussars”.
 Amalgamated on 1 June, 1901, with the 5th Dragoons and Redesignated as the 6th Duke of Connaught's Royal Canadian Hussars.
 Amalgamated on 15 December, 1936, with the 1st Armoured Car Regiment and Redesignated as the 6th Duke of Connaught's Royal Canadian Hussars (Armoured Car).
 Redesignated on 27 February, 1941, as the 2nd (Reserve) Regiment, 6th Duke of Connaught's Royal Canadian Hussars (Armoured Car).
 Redesignated on 1 April, 1941, as the 15th (Reserve) Armoured Regiment, (6th Duke of Connaught's Royal Canadian Hussars).
 Redesignated on 4 February, 1949, as the 6th Duke of Connaught's Royal Canadian Hussars (15th Armoured Regiment).
 Redesignated on 19 May, 1958, as the 6th Duke of Connaught's Royal Canadian Hussars.
 Amalgamated on 16 September, 1958, with the 17th Duke of York's Royal Canadian Hussars and Redesignated as The Royal Canadian Hussars (Montreal).

5th Dragoons 

 Originated on 30 November 1877, in Cookshire, Quebec, as the 5th Provisional Regiment of Cavalry.
 Redesignated on 21 May 1886, as the 5th Regiment of Cavalry.
 Redesignated on 1 January 1893, as the 5th Dragoons.
 Amalgamated on 1 June 1901, with the 6th "Duke of Connaught's Royal Canadian Hussars" and Redesignated as the 6th Duke of Connaught's Royal Canadian Hussars.

1st Armoured Car Regiment 

 Originated on 1 June, 1919, in Montréal, Quebec, as the 1st Motor Machine Gun Brigade, CMGC.
 Redesignated on 1 October, 1936, as the 1st Armoured Car Regiment.
 Amalgamated on 15 December, 1936, with the 6th Duke of Connaught's Royal Canadian Hussars and Redesignated as the 6th Duke of Connaught's Royal Canadian Hussars (Armoured Car).

17th Duke of York's Royal Canadian Hussars 

 Originated on 1 March 1907, in Montréal, Quebec, as The 17th Duke of York's Royal Canadian Hussars.
 Redesignated on 15 July 1912, as The 17th Duke of York's Royal Canadian Hussars "Argenteuil Rangers".
 Redesignated on 15 March 1920, as the 17th Duke of York's Royal Canadian Hussars.
 Redesignated on 11 February 1941, as the 2nd (Reserve) Regiment, 17th Duke of York's Royal Canadian Hussars.
 Redesignated on 1 April 1941, as the 7th (Reserve) Reconnaissance Battalion, (17th Duke of York's Royal Canadian Hussars).
 Redesignated on 8 June 1942, as the 7th (Reserve) Reconnaissance Regiment (17th Duke of York's Royal Canadian Hussars), CAC.
 Redesignated on 2 August 1945, as the 7th (Reserve) Reconnaissance Regiment (17th Duke of York's Royal Canadian Hussars), RCAC.
 Redesignated on 4 February 1949, as the 17th Duke of York's Royal Canadian Hussars (7th Reconnaissance Regiment).
 Redesignated on 19 May 1958, as the 17th Duke of York's Royal Canadian Hussars.
 Amalgamated on 16 September 1958, with the 6th Duke of Connaught's Royal Canadian Hussars and Redesignated as The Royal Canadian Hussars (Montreal).

11th Regiment Argenteuil Rangers 
 Originated on 14 June 1862, in Gore, Quebec, as the 11th Battalion Volunteer Militia Infantry of Canada or Argenteuil Rangers.
 Later Redesignated in the same year as the 11th Battalion of Infantry Argenteuil Rangers.
 Redesignated on 8 May, 1900, as the 11th Regiment Argenteuil Rangers.
 Disbanded on 15 April, 1912, and Personnel Absorbed by The 17th Duke of York's Royal Canadian Hussars and Redesignated as The 17th Duke of York's Royal Canadian Hussars "Argenteuil Rangers".

Lineage chart

Perpetuations

War of 1812 

 Canadian Light Dragoons
 Company of Guides
 Royal Montreal Troop of Volunteer Cavalry
 Argenteuil and Vaudreuil Divisions (1812-15)

Pre-Confederation 

 No. 1 Troop, Montreal Cavalry (1855)

The Great War 

 1st Canadian Motor Machine Gun Brigade, CEF

History 
Since the amalgamation, the regiment itself has not been involved in any hostilities but has constantly provided individuals to augment the Regular Force in both NATO and United Nations peacekeeping duties as well as domestic operations such as Operation Recuperation during the Ice Storm of 1998.

The regiment received its second guidon on December 3, 1974, the 100th anniversary of regimental status and its 135th year as a Canadian cavalry unit.

From 1986 to 1990, the regiment won the Royal Canadian Armoured Corps Buchanan Trophy (the best armour unit in the Eastern and Atlantic Areas) a total of five times and the Worthington Trophy (the best armour unit in Canada) a total of three times.

In August 1990, the regiment commanded and formed the headquarters and one complete squadron for the first-of-its-kind Militia brigade-level exercise. Exercise En Guard was held at Canadian Forces Base Gagetown and included the four armoured units of Secteur de l'Est (RBSE).  Shortly afterwards, in September 1990, the regiment sent a 21-man contingent to Cyprus augmenting the 12e Régiment blindé du Canada on its United Nations peacekeeping tour of duty.

Since 1990 the regiment has deployed troops on UN missions in both Haiti and Bosnia, as well as providing personnel during the Oka crisis and the ice storm of 1998.  The unit has also continued to participate in the Noble Lion exercises as part of Land Force Quebec Area.  On April 1, 1997, The Royal Canadian Hussars (Montreal) became the establishment armoured regiment (tank) for the newly formed 34th Canadian Brigade Group (34 CBG). E organization falls under the command of 34 CBG.

In late 2003, the mission of the RCH was changed to fit the restructuring plan of the Canadian Forces Land Force Command. The troops were converted back to a role of armoured reconnaissance. The regiment comprises two squadrons: B Squadron (combat troops) and C&S Squadron (command and support). On May 1, 2005, the RCH received its third guidon.

In 2007 seven members of the RCH were deployed to Afghanistan as part of Joint Task Force Afghanistan (JTF AFG) Rotation 4, which included approximately 2330 Canadian Forces members from the Quebec region.

From November 2010 to July 2011, six members or the RCH were again deployed in the Kandahar region of Afghanistan as part of the Joint Task Force Afghanistan Rotation 10.

Alliances 

  - The Queen's Royal Hussars
  - The Light Dragoons

Battle Honours

The War of 1812 

 Defence of Canada – 1812–1815 – Défense du Canada
 The non-emblazonable honorary distinction Defence of Canada – 1812–1815 – Défense du Canada

South African War 

 South Africa, 1900

The First World War 

 Mount Sorrel
 Somme, 1916, '18
 Flers–Courcelette
 Thiepval
 Arras, 1917, '18
 Vimy, 1917
 Hill 70
 Ypres, 1917
 Passchendaele
 Bapaume, 1918
 Rosières
 Avre
 Amiens
 Scarpe, 1918
 Drocourt–Quéant
 Hindenburg Line
 Canal du Nord
 Cambrai, 1918
 Valenciennes
 Sambre
 France and Flanders 1915–18

The Second World War 

 Caen
 Falaise
 The Laison
 The Scheldt
 Breskens Pocket
 The Rhineland
 The Rhine
 Emmerich–Hoch Elten
 Zutphen
 Deventer
 North-West Europe 1944–1945

War in Afghanistan 

 Afghanistan

Notable members
James Angus Ogilvy, retail store magnate. Donor of the Ogilvy sword, a trophy given yearly to the officer of the year.
James Ross (Canadian businessman), notable for his role in the completion of the Canadian Pacific Railway; appointed Honorary Lieutenant-Colonel of the 17th Duke of York's Royal Canadian Hussars in 1900; was also a governor of McGill University and president of the Montreal Museum of Fine Arts.
Ben Weider,   businessman, bodybuilder and Napoleonic historian.
LGen ELM "Tommy" Burns,  served in the regiment. He was Canada's military representative at the UN on disarmament for many years.
Lieutenant-Colonel (Retd) Roman Jarymowycz, O.M.M., C.D., Dean and Director of the Militia Command and Staff Course, serving as an instructor for 15 years.
Eric Barry

See also

 The Canadian Crown and the Canadian Forces
 List of Armouries in Canada

Order of precedence

Notes and references

External links
 The Royal Canadian Hussars Association Website

Royal Canadian Hussars
Armoured regiments of Canada
Hussar regiments of Canada
Military units and formations of Quebec
Armoured regiments & units of Canada in World War II
Military units and formations established in 1877
1877 establishments in Canada